Zachary Alley is an American college football coach. He is the defensive coordinator at Jacksonville State University, a position he has held since 2022. Alley won two national championships as a graduate assistant at Clemson University.

Coaching career

Clemson
After graduating from Charlotte Country Day School, where he played on both the defensive and offensive lines; he went to Clemson. Alley began his coaching career as a student assistant his freshman year in 2011 and worked as an assistant his entire time as a student at Clemson. Once he graduated he became a graduate assistant from 2015 to 2018, where he won two national championships under Dabo Swinney.

Boise State

A month after he was signed to be the nickels coach for the Charlotte 49ers, Alley became the inside linebackers coach for the Broncos for the 2019 season. For the 2020 season he coached the outside linebackers while also being the co-special teams coordinator. During the season Alley contracted COVID-19.

ULM

Under the recommendation of Brent Venables, Alley was hired by Terry Bowden to be the defensive coordinator for the Warhawks in 2021. Only being 27 years old he was the youngest FBS coordinator.

Jacksonville State
When Rich Rodriguez was hired as the new head coach at Jacksonville State, after serving as the offensive coordinator at Louisiana-Monroe, he brought Alley with him as his defensive coordinator.

References

Year of birth missing (living people)
Living people
Boise State Broncos football coaches
Clemson Tigers football coaches
Jacksonville State Gamecocks football coaches
Louisiana–Monroe Warhawks football coaches
Clemson University alumni
Sportspeople from Charlotte, North Carolina
Coaches of American football from North Carolina